Alice Bird is a British actress best known for playing Lizzy in series 2 of the ITV2 drama Footballers' Wives: Extra Time. She also appeared in the film Notes on a Scandal based on the novel of the same name written by Zoë Heller.

External links

Living people
British actresses
Year of birth missing (living people)
Place of birth missing (living people)
21st-century British actresses